Osmund Andersen Lømsland (2 July 1765 – 25 August 1841) was a Norwegian farmer who served as a representative at the Norwegian Constituent Assembly.

 
Osmund Andersen Lømsland was born at the  village of Mosby in  Oddernes, a borough in Kristiansand, Norway. He was engaged in farming. In 1806, he bought the farm Lømsland at Tveit  in Vest-Agder where he remained throughout his life. About 1790, Osmund Andersen was married with Anna Torstensdatter Lauvsland from the parish of Finsland (1766-1837). The couple had seven children born in the period 1790- 1803, of whom only three lived into adulthood. 

He was elected to the Norwegian Constituent Assembly in 1814, representing the constituency of Mandals Amt (now Vest-Agder).
At the Assembly, he supported the union party (Unionspartiet).

References

1765 births
1841 deaths
Fathers of the Constitution of Norway
Vest-Agder politicians
People from Vest-Agder